The following is an incomplete list of festivals in South America, with links to separate lists by country and region where applicable. This list includes festivals of diverse types, including regional festivals, commerce festivals, film festivals, folk festivals, carnivals, pow wows, recurring festivals on holidays, and music festivals. Music festivals are annotated "(music)" for countries where there is not a dedicated music section.

This list overlaps with List of film festivals in South America.

Sovereign states

Argentina

Bolivia

Brazil

Chile

Colombia

List of festivals in Colombia
List of festivals in La Guajira (region)
Carnival in Colombia

Ecuador

Fiestas de Quito
Pachamama Raymi
Quito Fest (music)
Toro de fuego
Mama Negra

Guyana

Mashramani (music)
Caribbean Festival of Arts

Paraguay

Maquinaria festival (music)
Paraguay Bicentennial
Reggae Fest (music)
Ypacaraí Festival

Peru

Suriname

Caribbean Festival of Arts

Uruguay

Public holidays in Uruguay

Venezuela

Paz Sin Fronteras (music)

Dependencies and other territories

Falkland Islands
Culture of the Falkland Islands

French Guiana

Carnival in French Guiana

South Georgia and the South Sandwich Islands

See also

List of festivals
List of film festivals
List of music festivals
:Category:Lists of festivals in South America

References

External links

Region topic template using suffix
₵South America
 
and